Charmaine Papertalk Green (born 1962) is an Indigenous Australian poet. As Charmaine Green she works as a visual and installation artist.

Green is a Yamaji woman, born in 1962 at Eradu near Geraldton in Western Australia.

Career

Poetry 
A number of her poems were included in Those Who Remain Will Always Remember: An Anthology of Aboriginal Writing.

Her work was included in The New Oxford Book of Australian Verse (3rd edition), while her 2019 poetry collection, Nganajungu Yagu, won the 2020 Victorian Premier's Prize for Poetry. Green won the 2020 ALS Gold Medal for Nganajungu Yagu and was shortlisted in 2019 for False Claims of Colonial Thieves. In the 2020 Queensland Premier's Literary Awards, Judith Wright Calanthe Prize for Poetry, she was shortlisted for Nganajungu Yagu.

Her 2018 book False Claims of Colonial Thieves, co-written with John Kinsella, was shortlisted for the John Bray Poetry Award at the 2020 Adelaide Festival Awards for Literature. In his 2018 review, Robert Wood wrote: "As a critique of colonial Australia and a historical document, False Claims of Colonial Thieves has a certain weight and importance". She and Kinsella were interviewed by Claire Nichols for The Book Show on ABC Radio National.

Art 
Green won the poster competition at the NAIDOC Awards in 2006. She is represented by Yamaji Art Centre, Geraldton.

Works
 Just Like That and Other Poems, Fremantle Arts Centre Press, 2007 
Tiptoeing Tracker Tod, Oxford University Press, 2014 
 False Claims of Colonial Thieves, co-authored with John Kinsella, Magabala Books, 2018 
 Nganajungu Yagu, Cordite Books, 2019

References

External links
Charmaine Green, artist

1962 births
Living people
21st-century Australian women writers
21st-century Australian writers
Australian women poets